The Lehigh Switchback Rail-Trail is a rail trail in Jim Thorpe, PA.

The trail surface is natural, consisting of dirt, roots, rocks, and occasional coal chunks. The trail runs downhill on the 
former right-of-way of the Mauch Chunk Switchback Railway from Summit Hill to Jim Thorpe. 
Located midway on the trail is  Mauch Chunk Lake Park which provides parking for hiking & biking up and down the trail.

Several bicycle outfitters in the area provide bike rental and shuttle services to the top of Summit Hill that allows riders
to enjoy a 100% downhill ride to the town of Jim Thorpe.

References

External links
 Gravity railroad  Official Trail web site
 Pocono Whitewater Local bike shuttle service
 Blue Mountain Sports  Local bike shuttle service
 Rails-to Trails Rails-to-Trails page for the Switchback

Rail trails in Pennsylvania
National Recreation Trails in Pennsylvania
Protected areas of Carbon County, Pennsylvania